McInerney, Francis was a Gaelic footballer from Doonbeg County Clare. He won a Munster Senior Football Championship as captain in 1992 when Clare had a surprise win over Kerry in the final. 

At club level he played with Doonbeg and had much success. He won Clare Senior Football Championship in 1988, 1991, 1995, 1996, 1998, 1999 and 2001, he also won a Munster Senior Club Football Championship and played in losing finals in 1991 and 1999.

References

http://www.hoganstand.com/Clare/ArticleForm.aspx?ID=63010

Honours
Club
 Clare Senior Football Championship (7) 1988 1991 1995 1996 1998 1999 2001
 Munster Senior Club Football Championship (1) 1998
Clare
 McGrath Cup (6) 1986 1991 1990 1994 1995 1997
 National Football League Division 2 (2) 1992 1995
 Munster Senior Football Championship (1) 1992 

Clare inter-county Gaelic footballers
Doonbeg Gaelic footballers
Living people
Year of birth missing (living people)